St. John Chrysostom Church could refer to:

St. John Chrysostom Church (Delafield, Wisconsin).
St. John Chrysostom Byzantine Catholic Church in Pittsburgh, Pennsylvania.
St. John Chrysostom's Church (Bronx, New York)
St. John Chrysostom Church, Novokuznetsk